Pseudacaromenes is a small Neotropical genus of large potter wasps containing two known species: the Amazon basin endemic Pseudacaromenes alfkenii and the widespread (Mexico to Paraguay) Pseudacaromenes johnsoni.

References

 Giordani Soika, A. 1990. Revisione degli Eumenidi neotropicali appartenenti ai generi Pachymenes Sauss., Santamenes n. gen., Brachymenes G. S., Pseudacaromenes G. S., Stenosigma G. S. e Gamma Zav. (Hymenoptera). Boll. Mus. Civ. Stor. Nat. Venezia 39: 71–172.
 Garcete-Barrett, B. R. 2001. Notes on Neotropical Eumeninae I (Hymenoptera: Vespidae). Bol. Mus. Nac. Hist. Nat. Parag., 13 : 38 - 40.

Potter wasps
Hymenoptera genera